Rushville is a city in Rushville Township, Rush County, in the U.S. state of Indiana. The population was 6,341 at the 2010 census. The city is the county seat of Rush County. It, like the county, was named in honor of Dr. Benjamin Rush, who signed the Declaration of Independence.

History
Rush County was formed from the unorganized Delaware County April 1, 1822. On July 29 town lots were sold and the town started to form. A school had already been started in 1821 by Dr. W.B. Laughlin, who was a member of the Legislature when the county was formed, and is considered the founding father of the town. A jail was built, Charles Veeder, was the first postmaster in 1822, and a courthouse was built in 1823. The Dog Fennel Gazette was published in 1823. The railroad was built in 1850 and after that a bank, factories, mills, and grain elevators sprang up.

The Rushville post office has been in operation since 1822.

Rushville was the campaign headquarters for Wendell Willkie's 1940 presidential campaign against Franklin D. Roosevelt. Willkie is buried in the city's East Hill Cemetery.

The Durbin Hotel, John K. Gowdy House, Melodeon Hall, Rush County Courthouse, Rushville Commercial Historic District, St. Paul Methodist Episcopal Church, St. Prendergast Catholic church, Booker T. Washington School, and Wendell Lewis Willkie House are listed on the National Register of Historic Places.

Geography
Rushville is located at  (39.614482, -85.448657), along the Flatrock River.

Demographics

As of the census of 2000, there were 5,995 people, 2,434 households, and 1,552 families residing in the city. The racial makeup of the city was 96.45% White, 1.58% African American, 0.20% Native American, 0.85% Asian, 0.05% Pacific Islander, 0.13% from other races, and 0.73% from two or more races. Hispanic or Latino of any race were 0.40% of the population.

There were 2,434 households, out of which 31.2% had children under the age of 18 living with them, 46.9% were married couples living together, 12.7% had a female householder with no husband present, and 36.2% were non-families. 31.6% of all households were made up of individuals, and 15.2% had someone living alone who was 65 years of age or older. The average household size was 2.39 and the average family size was 2.99.

In the city, the population was spread out, with 25.2% under the age of 18, 8.6% from 18 to 24, 28.6% from 25 to 44, 20.2% from 45 to 64, and 17.5% who were 65 years of age or older. The median age was 37 years. For every 100 females, there were 89.0 males. For every 100 females age 18 and over, there were 85.0 males.

The median income for a household in the city was $30,233, and the median income for a family was $36,646. Males had a median income of $30,127 versus $22,440 for females. The per capita income for the city was $17,072. About 8.1% of families and 11.0% of the population were below the poverty line, including 12.3% of those under age 18 and 12.0% of those age 65 or over.

Education
The town has a lending library, the Rushville Public Library.

Notable people 

 Samuel Bigger, Governor of Indiana
 Carmelita Geraghty, silent film actress
 Gerald Geraghty, screenwriter
 Maurice Geraghty, screenwriter
 Thomas J. Geraghty, screenwriter
 Joe Hogsett, politician and lawyer
 Leonidas Sexton, 19th Century politician
 Knowles Shaw, author and composer
 Frazier Thomas, television personality
 Philip Willkie, politician and businessman
 Wendell Willkie, Presidential candidate, lawyer, businessman
 Edward H. Wolfe, Union Army general
 Janet Gray Hayes, 60th mayor of San Jose, California

References

External links
 City of Rushville website
 "Wendell Willkie, Presidential Contender" from C-SPAN's The Contenders, broadcast from Rushville

Cities in Indiana
Cities in Rush County, Indiana
County seats in Indiana
1822 establishments in Indiana